Sesame Place may refer to one of many Sesame Street-themed amusement parks:

 Sesame Place (Pennsylvania), the original park under the name
 Sesame Place (San Diego), a park that opened in March 2022
 Sesame Place (Irving, Texas), a theme park operated by SeaWorld Parks & Entertainment 1982–1984